Xavion was a rock band from Memphis, Tennessee who were active in the 1980s. They had the distinction of being the first African-American rock group to appear on MTV. They are known for the singles "Get Me Hot" and "Eat Your Heart Out".

Background
The band was founded by Michael "Slugger" Tucker and later discovered by Jim Delehart of Mirage Records. It was fronted by Dexter Haygood and at one stage they toured with Hall & Oates. The also toured with The Bar Kays, The Romantics and Sly & the Family Stone. They were managed by Tommy Mottola. They also had a degree of success with  "Get Me Hot" and "Eat Your Heart Out". They were around four years before Living Color arrived on the scene and a little over a year before Mazarati, and in spite of being the first African-American rock band to be featured on MTV, they never found the success that Living Color achieved. They performed their single "Eat Your Heart Out" on MTV.

In early December 1984, their album Burnin' Hot was Bubbling Under the Top 200 Albums chart at no 205. They were pictured in the January 25, 1985 issue of Billboard with Mirage/Asylum/Nonesuch Records  staff members Mike Bone and Lisa Frank who was being held up by one of the band members.

Later years
Around October 2011, Haygood was looking to reform the group. After appearing on X Factor, he was noticed by some of his former bandmates. Today Haygood appears also as a solo performer. Michael "Slugger" Tucker has a solo album entitled 2 Times Ten. The Xavion group has new management with Donald Askew Jr., the CEO of Soul Star Entertainment.

Discography

Album

Singles

References

African-American rock musical groups
Rock music groups from Tennessee
Musical groups from Memphis, Tennessee
Asylum Records artists